Erode is a city in the Indian state of Tamil Nadu. Erode is the seventh largest urban agglomeration in the state, after Chennai, Coimbatore, Madurai, Tiruchirapalli, Tiruppur and Salem. It is also the administrative headquarters of the Erode district. Administered by a city municipal corporation since 2008, Erode is a part of Erode Lok Sabha constituency that elects its member of parliament. Erode is an agricultural, textile and a BPO hub and among the largest producers of turmeric, hand-loom and knitwear, and food products.

History 
The Etymology of Erode might have its origin in the Tamil phrase Eeru Odai meaning two streams based on the presence of two water courses of Perumpallam and Pichaikaranpallam Canal. Alternatively, it might have been derived from the Tamil phrase Eera Odu meaning 'wet skull' based on Indian mythology. During Sangam age, Erode region formed a part of the historical Kongu Nadu region ruled by Cheras and then by Kalabhras who were ousted by Pandyas around 590 CE. Afterward, it was ruled by Rashtrakutas and by Cholas from the 10th to early 13th century. Erode was annexed by Vijayanagara Empire in 1378 CE till gaining independence in 1559 CE by Madurai Nayaks. Erode became a part of the Hindu Wodeyar-ruled Mysore Kingdom in the early 1700s CE before coming under the control of the British East India Company with Maharaja of Mysore still as principal ruler. Erode remained under British Colonial rule until the Indian independence in 1947.

Geography
Erode has a hilly terrain with undulating topography as the Urugumalai, Athimalai, Chennimalai hills surround the city. The Amaravathy, Noyyal, Bhavani, and Kaveri rivers flow into the city. While no notable mineral resources are available, loam, gravel and limestone are found in abundance in the river beds.

Climate 
Erode has a semi-arid climate with hot to sweltering temperatures throughout the year and relatively low rainfall. Like the rest of Tamil Nadu, March to June are the hottest and December to January the mildest months of the year. Because the Southwest monsoon (June to August) brings scanty rainfall, the bulk of Erode's rainfall is received during the Northeast monsoon in October and November. Gunderipallam and Varattupallam receive the highest rainfall (1200 mm) in the district.

Demographics

As of 2011, Erode has 521,776 in population with a sex-ratio of 996, above the national average of 929. A literacy rate of 85% compares favorably to the national average of 73%. The city had 43,184 households, with Scheduled Castes and Scheduled Tribes accounting for 11% and 0.15% of the population respectively. Of its 66,135 workers, 61,382 are classified as other workers and the rest in agriculture and household industries. As of 2001, 52 slums were identified with 33,000 people residing in slums. Per the religious census of 2011, Erode had 83% Hindus, 12% Muslims and 4% Christians. The population had increased 11 times during the 20th century. While Tamil is the main spoken language, English is common as the medium of instruction in educational institutions and in the service sector.

Economy

Erode district's gross domestic product (GDP) grew at 15.5% in 2008 ahead of the state's GDP growth by 4%. According to Indian Census of 2001, urban workforce participation rate for Erode is 35% with growth in secondary and tertiary sectors and a corresponding decrease in the primary sector. Major employment is provided by textile industry, turmeric industry and oil and rice mills with 69% of its workforce employed in tertiary sector.

Erode is famous for several markets. Erode is the country's largest turmeric market. Erode Turmeric and Bhavani Carpets has finally received GI tag from the Geographical Indication in 2019. Turmeric Prices for the whole of India are fixed at four markets in Erode, one of which is ETMA Turmeric Market Complex located at Semmampalayam in Erode. Erode has two of the country's largest textile markets - one is Abdul Gani Textile Market (Public/Govt) and another one is Texvalley (Public-Private Joint Venture).

PDEXCIL (Powerloom Development & Export Promotion Council) has set up its regional office in Texvalley under the Ministry of Textiles, Government of India. It is a non-profit organisation working for the development of Powerloom Industry and promoting export of Fabrics and made ups from Powerloom Manufacturers.

Erode is also famous for its cattle markets. There are four major notable cattle markets in the district. One of them is located in the core city and is known as Karungalpalayam Cattle Market, which is one of the largest cattle market in the state.

As of 2001, the district had two industrial estates with 60 tanneries, 165 lock manufacturing and several cotton spinning mills. While hand loom weaving and carpet manufacturing flourished in early days, emergence of power loom led to 24,189 small scale and 59 large scale units by 2000.

The district is also rich in agriculture. The city is one of the largest manufacturers of food products in the state. Many food product manufacturers and poultries have established their base in and around the city.

Erode is famously known as "Turmeric City" on account of the production of turmeric in the state. It also has one of the largest markets for coconut. and coconut oil production in South India. Erode stands second in leather processing in the state, next to Ambur. Paper manufacturing companies like Seshasayee paper boards are located on the banks of the river Kaveri. Sugarcane processing industry here complements paper manufacturing from bagasse. Additionally, several small and medium-scale industries like dal mills, cotton mills, vanaspathi manufacturers, wax, screen printing, and printing presses are located in the city.

Erode has one of the three electric locos sheds under the Southern Railway, carrying out various major and minor maintenance schedules of electric locomotives.  Electric loco shed, Erode is now housing the largest fleet of WAP-4 in Indian Railways, and it caters to many long-distance electric trains. It has a diesel loco shed too.

The Nethaji Market is an important wholesale, and retail central market for vegetables and fruits in the city. Originally, the market was functioning along two major roads in the north of the clock tower area. It originated in the Chozha era. In 1935, Erode City Municipal Corporation constructed the market shops along RKV Road near Old Busstand. Recently, Erode City Municipal Corporation has planned to shift the wholesale market to the outskirts of the city considering the traffic congestion and road infrastructure of this area.

Tourism

Periya Mariamman Temple, Natadreeswarar Temple, the hillock temple of the Kaveri river, Sangameswarar Temple are prominent religious destinations in the city. While the city is built around a demolished fort, a temple for Arudra Kabaleeswar (Shiva) praising the Saiva and one for Kasthuri Ranganatha Perumal (Vishnu) praising the Vaishnava aspects of Hinduism exists. E.V.R Corporation Museum and Thanthai Periyar Memorial House, which depicts the life of Periyar E. V. Ramasamy, are prominent museums in the city. Sankagiri Fort and Vellode Birds Sanctuary are other visitor attractions around the city. CSI Brough Memorial Church, located on Meenatchi Sundaranar Road (formerly Brough Road), was consecrated in 1933 by Rev. Antony Watson Brough (1861 -1936), an Australian Missionary.

Law and government 

Law and order is maintained by Erode sub division of Tamil Nadu Police headed by a Deputy Superintendent. There are seven law & order police stations located at Karungalpalayam, Bazaar, Surampatti, Veerappanchatram, Rangampalayam, Chithode and Periyar GH Police Station. There are special units like armed reserve, prohibition enforcement, district crime, social justice and human rights, district crime records and a special branch.

Erode is the headquarters of Erode District which was bifurcated from Coimbatore District in 1979. The town was constituted as a municipality in 1871, promoted to special-grade during 1980 and upgraded as a corporation in 2008. City's corporation area covers part of Bhavani, Modakurichi, Perundurai and Komarapalayam constituencies. Its functions are devolved into six departments: general administration/personnel, Engineering, Revenue, Public Health, city planning and Information Technology (IT) under the control of a Municipal Commissioner who is the executive head. Erode has 60 wards with an elected councillor. The legislative powers are vested in a body of 60 members, one each from the 60 wards. The legislative body is headed by an elected Chairperson assisted by a Deputy Chairperson.

The current Member of Parliament is A. Ganeshamurthi from the MDMK party. While Erode has two state assembly constituencies namely Erode East and Erode West to elect members (MLA) to Tamil Nadu Legislative Assembly once every five years, Erode had only one Indian parliamentary constituency (MP). The current MLA of Erode (East) is E. V. K. S. Elangovan, winning the by-election following to the sudden demise of the sitting MLA and his son Thirumagan Ee.Ve.Ra from Congress and Erode (West) is S. Muthusamy from DMK

Public services 

As of 2006, there were 46 public and private schools with four technical institutes; Government Engineering College, Technical Institute being most prominent. Three types of schools operate in Erode: government run schools, schools funded by the government but run by private trusts (aided schools) and schools funded completely by private trusts. Schools may follow Tamil Nadu Anglo Indian School Board, Tamil Nadu State Board, Matriculation or CBSE syllabus. The city falls under the purview of Erode Education District. There are four school playgrounds in the city.

Electricity supply is regulated and distributed by Tamil Nadu Electricity Board (TNEB) as the city along with its suburbs forms Erode Electricity Distribution Circle. A Chief Distribution engineer is stationed at the regional headquarters. Water supply is provided by Erode Municipality from river Kaveri through its eight reservoirs. For 2000–01, 14 million litres of water was supplied every day for households in the city. About 110-125 metric tonnes of solid waste were processed by the sanitary department in 2011. As there is no underground drainage system, disposal of sullage is through septic tanks, open drains and public conveniences with its  of storm water drains. Thandhai Periyar Government General Hospital serves as primary centre of healthcare. Several private hospitals such as Lotus Hospitals, Kumarasamy Hospital, Idhayam Apollo Specialty Hospital, C.K Hospital, Maruthi Medical Center Hospital (MMCH), Kovai Medical Center Hospital (KMCH), Erode Trust Hospital, National Hospital (formerly Savitha Hospital) serve in the area. As of 2011, municipality maintained 4,678 street lamps. The corporation operates two markets, namely the Nethaji market and Silambarasan kuttai market and a textile market named EKM Abdul Gani Market in Brough road.

Transport

Road

Additionally,  of state highways is maintained by State Highways Department. NH 544 connecting Salem – Coimbatore – Ernakulam, bypasses the city via Bhavani, Chithode, nasiyanur and Perundurai and the National Highway NH 381A connects Vellakoil and sangagiri,  bypasses the city through Pallipalayam. The Tamil Nadu State Transport Corporation has a sub-divisional headquarters at Erode (jeeva) under the Coimbatore division. Erode Central Bus Terminus, is the Second Largest main bus station complex for Tamil Nadu State Express Transport Corporation. Erode is well connected with the nearest cities of Tiruppur and Coimbatore by bus. Private carriers operate long-distance buses connecting to major cities like Chennai, Bangalore etc. The main arterial roads include:
 SH-15 connecting Erode – Gobichettipalayam – Sathy – Mettupalayam – Kotagiri – Ooty
 SH-83A connecting Erode – Arachalur – Kangeyam – Dharapuram
 SH-79 connecting Erode – Tiruchengode – Rasipuram – Attur
 SH-79A connecting Erode – Pallipalayam – Sankagiri
 SH-84 connecting Erode – Kodumudi – Karur
 SH-84A connecting Erode – Modakurichi – Vellakoil – Mulanur – Dharapuram
 SH-96 connecting Erode – Perundurai – Chennimalai – Kangeyam – Dharapuram

Rail
Erode Junction railway station is a major rail junction in Salem division of Southern Railway with a diesel locomotive shed and an electric locomotive shed attached. It also serves as a hub for water filling facilities, food provisions and cleaning services for long-distance trains that run via Erode. The following are the lines running from Erode junction:

Air

Notable people 
 

 J.Prabu (born 1986), actor and director

References

External links

 Erode City - Official site 
 Erode District - Official site

 
Textile industry of India